This is a list of Hollywood novels i.e., notable fiction about the American film and television industry and associated culture. The Hollywood novel is not to be confused with the Los Angeles novel, which is a novel set in Los Angeles and environs but not overtly about the movie business and its effect on the lives of industry participants and moviegoers.

Novels set in satires of Hollywood

See also
 Hollywood novel
 List of songs about Los Angeles

References/further reading

Brooker-Bowers, N.: The Hollywood Novel and Other Novels About Film, 1912–1982: An Annotated Bibliography, Garland, 1985.
Slide, A.: The Hollywood Novel: A Critical Guide to Over 1200 Works with Film-Related Themes or Characters, 1912 through 1994, McFarland & Co., 1995.

 Novels
Culture of Los Angeles
 
Hollywood novels
Hollywood novels
Hollywood novels
Hollywood novels
 

California literature